Paximadia ("rusks") are two small uninhabited islands in the gulf of Mesara located approximately  south of Agia Galini in Rethymno regional unit. They are in the Libyan Sea next to the southern coast of Crete. Due to their proximity to one another, the two islands appear as one from a distance.

Name
Locals often refer to the islands as Elephantaki because it looks like a baby elephant that is lying down, in the water, with its trunk facing west. The name attributed to the islands today is due to their resembling dry Cretan biscuit known as Paximadi (the plural being Paximadia). In ancient Crete they were also known as Dionysioi after the god Dionysus and also as Letoai or Letoa after the goddess Leto who was worshipped at Phaistos, where she was also known as Fitii in ancient times.

Mythology
In Cretan mythology it is believed that the goddess Leto gave birth to the god Apollo and the goddess Artemis on these islands.

Beaches
There are isolated sand beaches on these islands that can be reached via boat from Aghia Galini.

Literature
The Paximadia islands played a central role in the German novel Der kretische Gast (The Cretan Guest) by Klaus Modick.

See also
List of islands of Greece

References

Landforms of Rethymno (regional unit)
Uninhabited islands of Crete
Mediterranean islands
Islands of Greece